Marco Orsi (born 11 December 1990) is an Italian competitive swimmer who won eight gold medal at the European Short Course Swimming Championships.

Career
In 2012 Marco Orsi qualified for his first Olympic appearance in London 2012. He is trained by Roberto Odaldi.  He competed in the men's 50 m freestyle, and was part of the Italian men's 4 x 100 m freestyle relay team.  At the 2016 Summer Olympics, he was part of the Italian men's 4 x 100 m freestyle relay team.

See also
 Italian swimmers multiple medalists at the international competitions

References

External links
 

1990 births
Living people
Italian male freestyle swimmers
Swimmers at the 2012 Summer Olympics
Swimmers at the 2016 Summer Olympics
Olympic swimmers of Italy
Medalists at the FINA World Swimming Championships (25 m)
European Aquatics Championships medalists in swimming
World Aquatics Championships medalists in swimming
Mediterranean Games gold medalists for Italy
Mediterranean Games silver medalists for Italy
Swimmers at the 2009 Mediterranean Games
Swimmers at the 2013 Mediterranean Games
Mediterranean Games medalists in swimming
Swimmers of Fiamme Oro
21st-century Italian people
Sportspeople from the Metropolitan City of Bologna